Zamanabad (also Romanized as Zamānābād) is a village in Zirkuh Rural District, Bagh-e Bahadoran District, Lenjan County, Isfahan Province, Iran. At the 2006 census, its population was 1,042, in 219 families.

References 

Populated places in Lenjan County